Lighthouse is a Canadian rock band formed in 1968 in Toronto, Ontario, whose repertoire included elements of rock music, jazz, classical music, and swing and featured horns, string instruments, and vibraphone. They won Juno Awards for Best Canadian Group of the Year in 1972, 1973, and 1974.

Band history

Formation
Lighthouse was formed in 1968 in Toronto by vocalist/drummer Skip Prokop, previously of the Paupers, and keyboardist Paul Hoffert. The two met on a flight from New York City to Toronto, and discussed forming a band structured around a rock rhythm section, jazz horn section, and classical string section. Prokop had admired Ralph Cole's playing when they shared the bill at the Grande Ballroom in Detroit, so he invited him to Toronto to be the band's guitarist. Prokop and Hoffert assembled the rest of the group from friends, studio session musicians, and Toronto Symphony Orchestra members, and proceeded to make a demo recording.

Prokop and Hoffert took the demo to MGM Records in New York, who signed the band. Two days later they had a manager, Vinnie Fusco, from Albert Grossman's office, who overturned the MGM contract and made a deal with RCA Victor.

Lighthouse made its performing debut on May 14, 1969, at The Rock Pile in Toronto, introduced by Duke Ellington with the words, "I'm beginning to see the Light...house". The band originally consisted of 13 members:

Skip Prokop:  drums and vocals
Paul Hoffert:  keyboards and vibraphone
Ralph Cole:  guitar and vocals
Grant Fullerton:  bass and vocals
Vic "Pinky" Dauvin:  percussion and lead vocals
Ian Guenther:  violin
Don Dinovo:  violin and viola
Don Whitton:  cello
Leslie Schneider:  cello
Freddy Stone:  trumpet and flugelhorn
Arnie Chycoski:  trumpet and flugelhorn
Howard Shore:  alto saxophone
Russ Little:  trombone

One of the first Lighthouse concerts was at Carnegie Hall, and in its first year the band also played at Fillmore East, Fillmore West, Toronto, Boston, the Atlantic City Pop Festival, and the Monterey and Newport Jazz Festivals. A free concert at Toronto City Hall in the summer of 1969 drew a reported crowd of 25,000.

First albums
Their first album, Lighthouse, was released in June 1969 by RCA recorded in RCA's Toronto Eastern Sound Studio. It features "If There Ever Was a Time", which was a minor hit on CHUM 1050.

Their next album, Suite Feeling, was released in November 1969, recorded at Toronto Eastern Sound Studio. It features two cover songs: The Band's "Chest Fever" and The Beatles' "A Day In The Life". The single "Feel So Good" was a hit, peaking at #5 on the Canadian Content chart and #55 on the Canadian Top 100. Lighthouse was invited to perform at Woodstock that year, but turned it down.

Their third and final album for RCA was also the last for original lead singer Pinky Dauvin. Peacing It All Together was recorded in RCA's Music Centre of the World Hollywood Studios. It includes the Top 40 hit, "The Chant".

In the summer of 1970, Lighthouse represented Canada and Ontario at Expo '70 in Japan. The band appeared at the Strawberry Fields Festival in August 1970, followed by the Isle of Wight Festival where they performed two nights, along with The Doors, Joni Mitchell, Chicago, Miles Davis, and The Who.

New record label
At the end of 1970, due to less than expected sales, Lighthouse was dropped from RCA and moved to Evolution in the US and GRT in Canada, recording at Toronto's Thunder Sound Studios. There were some lineup changes; the band dropped from thirteen musicians to eleven, including five original members (Prokop, Hoffert, Cole, Dinovo, and Shore), and Bob McBride became the band's new lead singer.

One Fine Morning and commercial success
In July 1971, Lighthouse released One Fine Morning on Evolution/GRT. The title track from One Fine Morning was a hit in Canada, peaking at #2 on Canada's Singles Chart, eventually going platinum. The song was also an international and American hit, peaking at #24 on the Billboard Hot 100 chart, going gold, and the 'bubbling under' chart in the Netherlands. It was preceded on the Canadian charts by "Hats Off to the Stranger" (#9), yet another gold single. That year the band performed at the anniversary celebration concert in the city of Hamilton.

In between recording albums and touring 300 days a year, the band was involved in the first performances by a rock band with symphony orchestras, a collaboration with the Royal Winnipeg Ballet company, Ballet High, which toured across Canada, and a CBC production of Prometheus Bound with actress Irene Worth.

Thoughts of Movin' On
Thoughts of Movin' On was released on December 8, 1971. The lead single "Take It Slow (Out In The Country)" went to #12 on the Canadian Top 100, going gold. The album also features the hits "I Just Wanna Be Your Friend" (#54) and "I'd Be So Happy" (#32), the latter of which was covered by Three Dog Night on their 1974 album Hard Labor. Both Thoughts of Movin' On and One Fine Morning eventually went platinum in Canada.

Lighthouse Live! and Sunny Days
Lighthouse Live! was recorded live at Carnegie Hall in February 1972 and released on Evolution/GRT. This was the first time a Canadian album went platinum.

The band returned to the studio later that year releasing another gold album, Sunny Days, on Evolution/GRT. The title track became the band's second Top 5 Canadian hit single and second to go platinum. It was also a Top 40 hit on the Billboard Hot 100, peaking at #34 on December 9, 1972. Hoffert, tired of life on the road, left the band shortly after but continued as the band's executive producer.

During this period of recording from 1970 to 1972 with Evolution/GRT, RCA Records released a double album best-of in 1972 consisting of selections from the first three albums recorded with RCA entitled One Fine Light.

Can You Feel It
Bob McBride failed to appear at The Record Plant in New York City for the recording of their next album, Can You Feel It, and was fired. Prokop and Cole wanted to scrap the sessions but producer Jimmy Ienner insisted they continue. He decided that whoever wrote the song would sing it. Evolution sold the band's recording contract to Polydor in the US, which reportedly cost the label "six figures". With the exception of "No More Searching", written and sung by new sax player Dale Hillary, Prokop and Cole sang all the vocals and harmonies on the album. The result was one of the band's biggest single releases, "Pretty Lady", which was a Top 10 Canadian hit, and was their final Hot 100 hit in the US, reaching #53. It did better in Hawaii however, where it reached #1 for six consecutive weeks. Both the album and the single went gold in Canada.

Good Day and dissolution
Good Day, also on Polydor, was released in mid-September 1974. As with the previous album, the lead vocals were divided between Skip Prokop and Ralph Cole, but Prokop switched to guitar full-time and the drummer was Billy King. The album went gold and produced a minor hit with the title track. It also contains "Wide-Eyed Lady", a song co-written by Bob McBride.

At Thunder Sounds Recording Studios, the band began work on the next album, and had recorded several tracks when Prokop called it quits and left the band. The album was never completed.

Janus/GRT released Best of Lighthouse in January 1975 to capitalize on their past success. The album went gold in Canada.

Paul Hoffert recruited new members and Ralph Cole took the band out for another couple of tours with Doug Billard (formerly a member of Pepper Tree, Central Nervous System, and Five Sounds) as lead vocalist but in 1976 Lighthouse disbanded. Cole toured as Lighthouse once again from 1978-1980 with a nearly completely new lineup consisting of only one other previous Lighthouse member, Dale Hillary.

Reunion
Prokop, Hoffert, Cole, and McBride reunited along with many of the Lighthouse alumni in September 1982 for a weekend of four large concerts at Ontario Place. Afterwards the members went their separate ways and made no future plans. 

In 1989, Denon Records bought the rights to the Evolution/GRT recordings and released a greatest hits collection in Canada, The Best of Lighthouse - Sunny Days Again. The re-mix of the album was produced by Hoffert, Cole, Prokop, and McBride.

In 1992, the band reunited with a ten-member line-up which included founders Prokop, Hoffert, and Cole with McBride on vocals. McBride  was dismissed several months later. He was replaced by Dan Clancy.

Three years later Song of the Ages, the band's first new studio album in 22 years, was released by Breaking Records. The single, "Remember the Times", was a top-thirty hit in Canada. In 1998 the original master tapes of The Best of Lighthouse - Sunny Days Again were digitally re-mastered and released on CD by True North Records who also re-released Song of the Ages in 1999.

After disbandment
After Lighthouse disbanded in the 1970s, many of the members continued with their musical careers while some went in different directions.

Paul Hoffert has continued his career as a film composer, winning a Genie Award in 1978 for his score for the cult-hit movie Outrageous!; headed up the Ontario Arts Council from 1994 to 1997; created and was the Director of CulTech from 1992 to 2000, a Research Centre at York University, and has written five books exploring the intersection of culture and technology. In 2004 he received the Order of Canada.

Prokop and Cole formed other bands with some success before hitting their stride in the advertising world and as record producers. Saxophonist Howard Shore became the music director for Saturday Night Live and began a career in film composition, emerging as one of Hollywood's most sought after composers. Shore won three Academy Awards for The Lord of the Rings film trilogy. Don DiNovo bought a church in Arthur, Ontario, and turned it into a recording studio. Dick Armin continued his work as a creator of electronic string instruments.

Russ Little has continued as a musician and composer. He can be heard on numerous releases including his own albums, Snapshot, Footwork, and On the Shoulders of Giants. He was voted Best Trombonist of 2007 by Canada's National Jazz Awards. John Naslen became a recording engineer (he engineered the 1994 Lighthouse "Song of the Ages" release). Grant Fullerton continues to perform with his own band.

Louie Yacknin opted out of music altogether and bought a tire installation company. Larry Smith moved to Israel and created a software company for language translation. Bob McBride became a top studio session singer and was heard on numerous commercials but he suffered from drug abuse and serious illness, and died February 20, 1998, of heart failure in Toronto.

Arnie Chycoski, Don DiNovo, Keith Jollimore, Alan Wilmot, Dale Hillary, Freddy Stone, Pinky Dauvin, Joe Ambrosia and Skip Prokop are all deceased.

Lighthouse has remained together since they reunited in 1992. Since that time they have recorded one new studio album, Song of the Ages, released in 1996. The rhythm section for the ten-member group features the original founders, Prokop (drums), Hoffert (keyboards and vibraphone), and Cole (guitar) with Don Paulton (keyboard), Doug Moore (bass), and Dan Clancy (vocals). The horn section is made up of original member, trombonist Russ Little, Simon Wallis (saxophones and flute), Chris Howells (trumpet), and saxophonist Steve Kennedy who performed with the band at Ontario Place in 1982. Lighthouse continues to perform and create innovative works including a reunion concert with the Edmonton Symphony Orchestra that was broadcast nationally, a tour of Brazil with an original multimedia stage show in collaboration with the Desrosiers Dance Theatre, and a series of concerts in which sections of the band performed in different locations across Toronto linked together by broadband cable. In 1995 Lighthouse was inducted into the Q107 Canadian Rock ‘n’ Roll Hall of Fame.

Lighthouse songs have been used in films and covered by other artists including Three Dog Night, Shobha, and Carlos Santana. Rap artist Akon has sampled "I'd Be So Happy" and Japanese rock stars Theatre Brook perform "One Fine Morning" in their stage show.

Recent activity
For Lighthouse's 40th anniversary, Ole/Universal Records released 40 Years of Sunny Days, a retrospective of their biggest hits, featuring digitally remastered tracks, and a DVD of new performances recorded at Q Music in 5.1 Surround Sound.

On July 19, 2013, it was announced that the band would be appearing on the second annual Moody Blues Cruise in April, 2014 on the cruise ship MSC Divina.

In April 2013, Skip Prokop suffered from ventricular tachycardia. A device was implanted to regulate his heart. Prokop toured with Lighthouse throughout 2013 but was diagnosed with Type 2 Diabetes, then suffered more heart trouble requiring bypass surgery. He officially retired from music in 2016 and died at the age of 73 on August 30, 2017 from heart complications. He was replaced by his son, Jamie Prokop.

The band's most recent compilation album, Icon, was released on August 10, 2018.

They continue to perform and tour extensively across Canada.

Band members

Horns

Roger Neff
Paul Adamson
Sam Alongi
Joe Ambrosia
John Capon
Bruce Cassidy
Arnie Chycoski
Don Englert
Doug Gibson
Dale Hillary
Chris Howells
Keith Jollimore
Steve Kennedy
Russ Little
Mike Lucas
Mike Malone
John Naslen
Pete Pantaluk
Howard Shore
Larry E. Smith
Rick Stepton
Freddy Stone
Dave Tanner
Simon Wallis
Rick Waychesko
Thomas Brown

Strings

Donald Whitton
Dick Armin
Paul Armin
Don Dinovo
Ian Guenther
Myron Moskalyk
Taras Chornywal
John Ogilvie
Leslie Schneider
Howie Wiseman

Drums and percussion

John Dell
Billy King
Skip Prokop
Tom Wills
Ronny Schreff
Jamie Prokop
 Michael Cervini

Gary Starling

Lead vocals

Dan Clancy
Pinky Dauvin
Billy Ledster
Bob McBride
Ralph Cole
Skip Prokop
Al Staniforth
Doug Billard

Bass

Grant Fullerton
Doug Moore
Dennis Pendrith
Terry Wilkins
Al Wilmot
Robert St. Clair Wilson
Gord Russell
Louie Yacknin

David A Wilson

Keyboards

Paul Hoffert
Fred Mandel
Don Paulton
Donald Quan
Sam See
Larry E. Smith
Phil DeMille
Rod Phillips
Lyndsey Parton

Guitar
Ralph Cole
Trevor Veitch
Fred Mandel
Skip Prokop (on Good Day)

Timeline

 Awards and nominations

Discography

Studio/live/compilation albums

Singles

Notes

References

External links
Official Website
 "Lighthouse", Encyclopedia of Music in Canada as hosted on The Canadian Encyclopedia
 
 at canadianbands.com
Jam! - The Canadian Pop Encyclopedia: Lighthouse (Dead link)

Musical groups established in 1969
Canadian progressive rock groups
Canadian jazz rock groups
Juno Award for Group of the Year winners
RCA Records artists
Vertigo Records artists
Musical groups from Toronto